Omorgus suberosus, common name hide beetle, is a beetle of the family Trogidae.

Description
The dorsal surface is convex and very rough, with ridges and tubercles, pale brown in color. Pronotum has long fine setae. These insects are carrion feeders. They overwinter as adults.

Distribution
This species is present in Czech Republic, Hungary, Spain, from southern USA to South America and in Australia (New South Wales, Queensland, Victoria, Western Australia).

References 

 Fabricius J.C. (1775) Systema Entomologiae, sistens insectorum classes, ordines, genera, species, adiectis synonymis, locis, descriptionibus, observationibus, Officina Libraria Kortii ; Flensburgi & Lipsiae 30 + 1-832
 César M. A. Correa, Anderson Puker, Vanesca Korasaki & Kleyton R. Ferreira Omorgus suberosus and Polynoncus bifurcatus (Coleoptera: Scarabaeoidea:Trogidae) in exotic and native environments of Brazil

suberosus
Beetles described in 1775